Haveeru Sports Awards is run by the Maldivian daily news magazine, Haveeru.

Golden Boot Award

Footballer of the Year

Referee of the Year

Coach of the Year

Under 21 Player of the Year

References

External links

 Association football trophies and awards
 Maldivian awards
 Annual events in the Maldives
 Football in the Maldives
 Awards by newspapers